The 2005 Girls' Youth European Volleyball Championship was the 6th edition of the competition, with the main phase (contested between 12 teams) held in Estonia from 29 March to 3 April 2005.

Qualification

Preliminary round

Pool A

|}

|}

Pool B

|}

|}

Pool C

|}

|}

Pool D

|}

|}

9th–12th classification

9th–12th semifinals

|}

11th place match

|}

9th place match

|}

Final round

Quarterfinals

|}

5th–8th semifinals

|}

Semifinals

|}

7th place match

|}

5th place match

|}

3rd place match

|}

Final

|}

Final standing

Awards
Most Valuable Player
  Olha Savenchuk
Best Attacker
  Olha Savenchuk
Best Server
  Jelena Alajbeg 
Best Blocker
  Natalia Dianskaya 
Best Setter
  Ana Grbac 
Best Libero
  Alexandra Vinogradova 
Best Receiver
  Lucia Bosetti

References

Girls' Youth European Volleyball Championship
Europe
Volley
Volley
International volleyball competitions hosted by Estonia